The Penistone Line is operated by Northern Trains in the West Yorkshire Metro and Travel South Yorkshire areas of northern England. It connects Huddersfield and Sheffield via Penistone and Barnsley, serving many rural communities. Metrocards (Zone 5) can be used for travel between Huddersfield and Denby Dale and intermediate stations.

Line details

Huddersfield–Penistone 
From the joint L&YR/London and North Western Railway Huddersfield station, trains ran south to Springwood Junction (south of Huddersfield) on the London and North Western Railway Leeds–Manchester main line, where the L&YR line began; from there the route was as follows:
 Springwood Tunnel
 
 Meltham Branch Junction was the junction for the now disused Meltham branch line
 Lockwood Viaduct
 
 Robin Hood Tunnel
 Honley Tunnel
 
  was the junction for the now closed Holmfirth Branch Line.
 Thurstonland Tunnel
 
  also serves Shelley
 Clayton West Junction for the now closed Clayton West branch line Clayton West Junction signal box
 Cumberworth Tunnel
 Denby Dale also serves Upper Cumberworth and Lower Cumberworth, and was originally Denby Dale & Cumberworth
 Denby Dale Viaduct
 Wellhouse Tunnel
 Penistone Viaduct
  The station was opened with the line; in 1874, a joint L&YR/Manchester, Sheffield and Lincolnshire Railway (GCR from 1899) station was built to replace the original M.S.& L.R. Penistone station which served only the line to Manchester. This line was closed to passenger traffic on 5 January 1970 and completely 11 years later.

The southern part of that section follows the upper reaches of the River Don.

Penistone–Barnsley–Sheffield 
At Penistone, the route joins the former Great Central Railway (GCR) line from Manchester via the Woodhead Tunnel, travelling eastwards. It deviates from the former main line towards Sheffield Victoria at a point once known as Barnsley Junction, and heads towards that town beyond which it takes a circuitous route via Wombwell before going south to Sheffield. The route is as follows:
 Penistone : the junction here was originally known as Huddersfield Junction.
 junction, originally Barnsley Junction, with the direct line to that town and West Silkstone Junction, a few miles further, via Worsborough to Wombwell and the Wath marshalling yard (freight-only) (closed)
  (was Silkstone: the station was re-opened when the direct line to Sheffield closed and trains diverted via Barnsley on 16 May 1983)
  (as for Silkstone – a re-opened station)
  (closed)
 the line then descends steeply, latterly at 1 in 50 to the former location of the junction which brought the M.S.& L. R. trains from Barnsley Court House to the Penistone line.
 the line joins the Lancashire & Yorkshire Railway's line from Wakefield and enters the former Barnsley Exchange, rebuilt and renamed Barnsley Interchange.
 Barnsley Interchange. Barnsley was served by three railway companies: L&Y, GCR, and Midland; and by two stations: Exchange and Court House. The latter is now closed.  The Penistone Line continues to Sheffield, leaving the station over Jumble Lane crossing on tracks of the former South Yorkshire Railway (later Great Central) but only for a short distance.  A connection made in April 1960 by British Rail gave access to the Midland route towards Sheffield (and also enabled the closure of Court House station):
 junction for the Birdwell and Pilley freight-only branch
 passes over Swaithe Viaduct high over the Worsborough line
  (was Wombwell West)
  (was Elsecar & Hoyland)
 Wentworth & Hoyland Common (closed)
 Tankersley Tunnel
  (was Chapeltown South).(not all trains stop here – check WY Metro) This station being the first to be rebuilt under the guidance of the South Yorkshire Passenger Transport Executive was moved some 500 yards further south and new approaches made from the town centre and via the ASDA car park.
 Meadowhall Interchange (the previous station on the site was named Wincobank and Meadowhall)
 , closed in the 1990s
 , closed in the 1990s.
 Sheffield Midland

Up until 1983, trains between Huddersfield and Sheffield travelled due south from Penistone direct to Sheffield via the old GCR line. The diversion to Barnsley officially opened in May 1983, and originally, the line was marketed with the brand name of The Hurrier.

Network Rail 

The Penistone Line today 

The Penistone Line Partnership, representing local interests, is a long-time supporter of services on the route and has provided music and real-ale trains.

In November 2005 the line was named as a pilot project within the Department for Transport's Community Rail Strategy. The section from Barnsley to Huddersfield was designated a community rail line in May 2006. This led to line speed improvements at Cumberworth Tunnel and improved reliability. Passenger numbers have continued to grow to a record 1,030,000 in 2005 – a stark contrast from the late 1970s and early 1980s when the line was under threat of closure due to falling levels of patronage and the possible loss of revenue support from both PTEs.
Although the entire Barnsley to Huddersfield route was originally double line, it is now single throughout following modernisation works in 1983 & 1989 (aside from a pair of crossing loops at Penistone and between Stocksmoor & Shepley) with control split between Huddersfield and Barnsley signal boxes.  The Rail Operating Centre at  will take over the signalling of the entire route by 2018.

Tram-train trial 
On 18 March 2008, the Department for Transport released details of a proposal to trial tram-trains on the Penistone Line, the first use of such vehicles in the UK. The trial was to start in 2010 and last for two years. Northern Rail, the operator of passenger services on the line, asked potential manufacturers to tender for the design and construction of five new vehicles, which Northern Rail would subsequently lease. In addition, Network Rail planned to spend £15m modifying track and stations to make them compatible with the new vehicles.

However, it was announced on 15 September 2009 that a city tram-train trial between Rotherham and Sheffield would replace the Penistone Line scheme.

Notes

References
Body, G. (1988), PSL Field Guides – Railways of the Eastern Region Volume 2, Patrick Stephens Ltd, Wellingborough,

Further reading

External links 

 Penistone Line Partnership
 South Pennines Rail Partnership
 Current timetable information

Rail transport in South Yorkshire
Rail transport in West Yorkshire
Community railway lines in England
Rail transport in Sheffield
Barnsley
Transport in Huddersfield
Transport in Kirklees
Holme Valley
Penistone
Tram transport in England
Railway lines in Yorkshire and the Humber
Standard gauge railways in England
Abandoned light rail projects in the United Kingdom